Christian Werner (born 28 June 1979) is a former German cyclist.

He rode in the 2003 Vuelta a España and the 2005 Giro d'Italia.

Major results

2002
 3rd Rund um Köln
 8th GP Triberg-Schwarzwald
2003
 4th GP Triberg-Schwarzwald
2004
 6th GP Triberg-Schwarzwald
 7th Overall Tour of Austria
 8th Overall Route du Sud

References

1979 births
Living people
German male cyclists
People from Bad Schwalbach
Sportspeople from Darmstadt (region)
Cyclists from Hesse